KMUS (1380 kHz) is a Spanish-language radio station licensed to Sperry, Oklahoma, and serving the Tulsa metropolitan area.  It is owned by Radio Las Américas, LLC.  KMUS airs a mix of Spanish language hits and talk shows, some of which are paid brokered programming.

By day, KMUS is powered at 7,000 watts.  To protect other stations on 1380 AM from interference, it uses a directional antenna with a six-tower array.  At night, it reduces power to only 250 watts.  Programming is heard around the clock on low-power FM translator K274CX at 102.7 MHz in Tulsa.

History
It changed to KLUE on July 25, 1987 with a format of crossover country. Three years later, the call sign reverted to KMUS and the station aired an adult standards format. 

Reunion Broadcasting, LLC sold it to The Walt Disney Company in 2004. Its transmitter site and city of license was relocated to Sperry, Oklahoma, and the format changed to the Radio Disney children's radio network. Sometime in the 1990s, the station began airing programming from the "Children's Satellite Network," which was later dropped in March 1998.

Disney took KMUS, and five other stations slated to be sold, off the air on January 22, 2010.  After the first attempt to sell the station fell through, a deal to sell KMUS to Radio Las Americas LLC was announced in February 2011.  

Radio Las Américas returned the station to the air on April 29 with a Spanish-language popular music format, along with two newscasts a day (which are audio-only versions of the newscasts on sister television station KXAP-LD).

Translator

References

External links 

MUS
Radio stations established in 1948
MUS
1948 establishments in Oklahoma
Former subsidiaries of The Walt Disney Company